Hunter in the Dark is a young adult novel by Monica Hughes, first published in 1982 and has been the subject of school study.   It is about a boy with leukemia who goes on a hunting expedition.

Plot summary
Mike Rankin is an athletic teenager from a wealthy family who is eager to obtain his big-game license to go deer hunting. When he suddenly collapses on the basketball court and is diagnosed with leukemia, he is determined not to be denied his dream hunting trip. He sets out on a journey which forces him to confront the fear which is overwhelming his life.

Awards
 1982 - R. Ross Annett Award for Children’s Literature (Writers' Guild of Alberta)
 1983 - Canadian Library Association, Young Adult Canadian Book Award
 1983 - American Library Association, Best Books for Young Adults

Reception
"This sensitive and wise story above all excels in resonant dialogue."

References

1982 Canadian novels
Canadian young adult novels
Novels by Monica Hughes